The southeastern Iberian script, also known as Meridional Iberian, was one of the means of written expression of the Iberian language, which was written mainly in the northeastern Iberian script and residually by the Greco-Iberian alphabet. About the relation between northeastern Iberian and southeastern Iberian scripts, it is necessary to point out that they are two different scripts with different values for the same signs; however it is clear that they had a common origin and the most accepted hypothesis is that northeastern Iberian script derives from southeastern Iberian script. In fact, the southeastern Iberian script is very similar, both considering the shape of the signs or their values, to the Southwestern script used to represent an unknown language usually named Tartessian. The main difference is that southeastern Iberian script does not show the vocalic redundancy of the syllabic signs. Unlike the northeastern Iberian script the decipherment of the southeastern Iberian script is not yet complete, because there are a significant number of signs on which scholars have not yet reached a consensus. Although it is believed that the southeastern Iberian script does not show any system to differentiate between voiced and unvoiced occlusives, unlike the northeastern Iberian script, a recent paper (Ferrer i Jané 2010) defends the existence of a dual system also in the southeastern Iberian script.

Typology and variants
All the paleohispanic scripts, with the exception of the Greco-Iberian alphabet, share a common distinctive typological characteristic: they represent syllabic value for the occlusives, and monophonemic value for the rest of the consonants and vowels.  From the writing systems point of view they are neither alphabets nor syllabaries; rather, they are mixed scripts that normally are identified as semi-syllabaries. There is no agreement about how the paleohispanic semi-syllabaries originated; some researchers conclude that their origin is linked only to the Phoenician alphabet, while others believe the Greek alphabet exercised some influence.

Location of findings
The inscriptions that use the southeastern Iberian script had been found mainly in the southeastern quadrant of the Iberian Peninsula: eastern Andalusia, Murcia, Albacete, Alicante, and Valencia. The southeastern Iberian inscriptions were made on different object types (silver and bronze coins, silver and ceramic recipients, lead plaques, stones, etc.), but they number around 50 and represent more or less only 2% of the total found. Between them there are the lead plaque from Gador (Almeria) and the lead plaque from La Bastida de les Alcuses (Moixent, València). The inscriptions that use this script almost always use the right to left direction of writing. The oldest inscriptions in southeastern Iberian script date to the 4th century BCE, and the latest ones date from the end of the 2nd century BCE.

See also
Greco-Iberian alphabet
Iberian scripts
Paleohispanic scripts
Celtiberian script
Northeastern Iberian script
Tartessian script
Paleohispanic languages
Pre-Roman peoples of the Iberian Peninsula

Notes

Bibliography 
 Correa, José Antonio (2004): «Los semisilabarios ibéricos: algunas cuestiones», ELEA 4, pp. 75-98.
 Ferrer i Jané, Joan (2010): «El sistema dual de l'escriptura ibèrica sud-oriental», Veleia 27, pp. 69-113. 
 Hoz, Javier de (1989): «El desarrollo de la escritura y las lenguas de la zona meridional», Tartessos, pp.523-587.
 Rodríguez Ramos, Jesús (2002): «La escritura ibérica meridional», Zephyrus 55, pp. 231-245.
 Untermann, Jürgen (1990): Monumenta Linguarum Hispanicarum. III Die iberischen Inschriften aus Spanien, Wiesbaden.
 Velaza, Javier (1996): Epigrafía y lengua ibéricas, Barcelona.

External links 
 The meridional Iberian writing - Jesús Rodríguez Ramos

Writing systems
Spanish culture
Iberian writing

no:Iberisk alfabet
ru:Иберское письмо